Eve Pownall MBE (1901–1982) was an Australian writer for children and historian who was born in Sydney, New South Wales.

Pownall was the eldest of three children and lived in Kiama, Windsor, Muswellbrook and Sydney before attending North Sydney Girls' High School.  She undertook a secretarial course before finding work at Fox Films and then at Metro-Goldwyn-Mayer Ltd until her marriage to Leslie Pownall in December 1929. The couple were to have two children.

She began to review children's literature for Australasian Book News and Literary Journal, and later began writing children's fiction and non-fiction of her own. She was appointed an MBE in 1978 and was the first recipient of the Lady Cutler award for distinguished service to children's literature in New South Wales.

Pownall was a founding member of the Children's Book Council of Australia (1945) and was associated with the Council for the rest of her life. The Children's Book Council presents the annual Eve Pownall Award for Information Books in her honour.

Pownall died at her home in Forestville in 1982.

Bibliography

Children's fiction 
 Nursery Rhymes Told Anew (1945)
 Squik the Squirrel Possum (1949)
 Cousins-Come-Lately : Adventures in Old Sydney Town (1952)
 Five Busy Merry-Makers (1953)
 Binty the Bandicoot (1957)
 A Drover (1970)

Children's non-fiction 
 The Australia Book (1952) illustrated by Margaret Senior
 Exploring Australia (1958)
 A Pioneer Daughter (1968)
 The Great South Land (1969) illustrated by Christine Shaw

Non-fiction 
 Mary of Maranoa : Tales of Australian Pioneer Women (1959)
 The Thirsty Land : Harnessing Australia's Water Resources (1967)
 The Children's Book Council of Australia : 1945–1980 (1980)
 Australia From The Beginning  (1980) illustrated by Walter Cunningham

Awards and nominations

Personal
 1978 – Member of the Order of the British Empire — for Service to Literature
 1981 – winner Lady Cutler Award for Distinguished Services to Children's Literature in New South Wales

For specific works 
 1952 – winner Children's Book of the Year Award: Older Readers for The Australia Book

References

1901 births
1982 deaths
20th-century Australian women writers
20th-century Australian writers
Australian children's writers
Writers from Sydney
Australian Members of the Order of the British Empire